John Walton may refer to:

People

In sport
John Walton (darts player) (born 1961), former BDO World Darts Champion and BDO World Masters Champion
John Walton (Formula One), late Formula One team manager
John Walton (footballer) (1928–1979), former English footballer with several clubs
John Walton (American football) (born 1947), American football player
John Walton (rugby league), rugby league footballer of the 1900s
John Walton (cricketer) (1888–1970), English cricketer
John Walton (sports broadcaster), American radio sports announcer

In politics
John Walton (Continental Congress) (1738–1783), Georgia Continental Congressman, signer of the Articles of Confederation
Sir John Lawson Walton (1852–1908), British MP and Attorney General of England and Wales
Jack C. Walton (John Calloway Walton, 1881–1949), former governor of Oklahoma
John Walton, Baron Walton of Detchant (1922–2016), British politician
John Walton (Australian politician) (1927–1994), Victorian state politician

Other
John Walton (translator) (fl. 1410), English Augustinian canon and poet
John Walton (bishop) (d. 1490?), English Augustinian abbot and archbishop of Dublin
John Walton (botanist) (1895–1971), British botanist and paleobotanist
John T. Walton (1946–2005), son of Walmart founder Sam Walton
John Walton (actor) (1952–2014), Australian actor
John Ike Walton, founding member of 13th Floor Elevators, a 1960s Texas rock group
John H. Walton (born 1952), Old Testament Scholar, professor of Old Testament at Wheaton College
John Isiah Walton (born 1985), American artist
John K. Walton, professor specializing in the history of the development of tourism
John Walton (entomologist) (1784–1862), English entomologist
John Walton (priest), English Anglican priest

Fictional people
John Walton, character in The $5,000,000 Counterfeiting Plot
"John-Boy" Walton and John Walton Sr., characters on the US television series The Waltons